Camp Blood: The Musical is a 2006 '80s style slasher musical underground film by Tanner Barklow, Jefferson Craig, and Thomas Hughes. The movie follows six teenagers (a virgin, jock, whore, nerd, rebel and goth) who arrive at Camp Blood to work as counselors for the summer but instead find themselves terrorized by a killer in a ski mask.

Characters
Sofia Alvarez – Kris, the virgin
Dan Wilcox – JT, the jock
Jacob Wolf – Cain, the rebel
Ashley Hanna (Kitty Brazelton, vocals) – Angel, the goth
Emma Manion – Justine, the slut
Tom Shoemaker – Marty, the nerd
Jim Bolenbaugh – (Thomas Bogdan, vocals) - The Killer
Ben Pawlik – Leo, the janitor
Scott Neagle – Simon Scuddamore, head counselor
Julieanne Smolinski – The Lesbian Trucker

Musical numbers
"The Camp Blood Theme", sung by the cast
"In Your Arms", sung by Kris & JT
"When the Tops Come Off", sung by Angel & Justine and the cast
"It's a Chase (Death Race)", sung by Angel
"In Your Arms (Reprise)", sung by Kris & JT
"The Killer's Song", sung by The Killer and the cast
"Victory Song/Camp Blood Theme (Reprise)" sung by Kris
Additionally, Falconhammer provided the opening title song "Demon of Time".

Reception
Reception for the film was mostly positive. Film Threat gave the film four stars, calling it "a scream in more ways than one". DVD Talk commented that the movie lacked "quality acting, production values, dialogue, or even singing voices. Yet, for some strange reason, when the entire thirty-minute film is over, all those shortcomings are completely forgivable."

Official selections and awards
Chicago Horror Film Festival (2006)
Lumberyard Media's Horrorfest (2006), Golden 2x4 for Best Picture, Best Actor (Wolf), and Best Song ("It's a Chase (Death Race)")
Rhode Island International Horror Film Festival (2006), Audience Award 
Bare Bones International Film Festival (2011)

References

External links
 

American slasher films
2000s musical films
2006 horror films
2006 films
Horror films about clowns
Camp Blood (film series)
2000s English-language films
2000s American films